Sri Lanka Army Sports Club is a first-class cricket team in Sri Lanka. It has competed in the Premier Trophy since 2006–07.

History
As of late January 2016, Sri Lanka Army Sports Club had played 93 first-class matches, for 38 wins, 21 losses and 34 draws, and 68 List A matches, for 35 wins, 28 losses and 5 unfinished.

Current squad
Players with international caps are listed in bold. Updated as on 2 August 2022.

Honours

Records

References

External links
Sri Lanka Army Sports Club at CricketArchive

Sri Lankan first-class cricket teams
Sri Lanka Army
Sports clubs in Colombo
Military cricket teams